Nemčice (until 1899 ) is a municipality in the Topoľčany District of the Nitra Region, Slovakia. In 2011 it had 977 inhabitants.

During World War II, the village was a site of mass killings of Jews and Roma. On September 11, 1944, 53 people were executed. The massacre was performed by German troops who had occupied Slovakia since August 29, 1944, when Slovak National Uprising began.

References

External links
Nemcice
Official homepage

Villages and municipalities in Topoľčany District